Marcelo Zaturansky Nogueira Itagiba (March 20, 1956, Rio de Janeiro) is a Brazilian politician.

Itagiba was the Brazilian Federal Police superintendent, secretary of public security of the Rio de Janeiro State during Rosinha Matheus' government in that State. In 2006, he was elected as a Lower House Congressman by the PMDB-RJ.

References

1956 births
Living people
Jewish Brazilian politicians
Brazilian Social Democracy Party politicians
Brazilian Democratic Movement politicians
Members of the Chamber of Deputies (Brazil) from Rio de Janeiro (state)